Joseph or Joe Conlin may refer to:

Joseph H. Conlin, American impresario and opera director.
Joseph R. Conlin, professor of American history
Joe Conlin, American football coach

See also
Joseph Conlan, film and television composer